Asa Edward Lacy (born June 2, 1999) is an American professional baseball pitcher in the Kansas City Royals organization. Lacy was selected fourth overall by the Royals in the 2020 Major League Baseball draft.

Amateur career
Lacy attended Tivy High School in Kerrville, Texas. As a senior, he went 13–1 with 0.93 earned run average (ERA) and 128 strikeouts over 97 innings. He was drafted by the Cleveland Indians in the 31st round of the 2017 Major League Baseball draft. He did not sign with the Indians and played college baseball at the Texas A&M University.

Lacy was mostly a relief pitcher his first year at Texas A&M in 2018. He appeared in 23 games with two starts, going 3–1 with a 2.75 ERA and 48 strikeouts. As a sophomore in 2019, he started 15 games going 8–4 with a 2.13 ERA and 130 strikeouts. After the season, he played for the United States collegiate national team. He made four starts in 2020 before the season was cancelled due to the COVID-19 pandemic.

Professional career
Lacy was selected by the Kansas City Royals with the fourth overall pick. He signed with the Royals on June 23 for a bonus of $6.67 million.

Lacy made his professional debut in 2021 with the Quad Cities River Bandits of the High-A Central. Over 14 starts, he went 2-5 with a 5.19 ERA, 79 strikeouts, and 41 walks over 52 innings. He missed time during the season due to a shoulder injury. He missed over two months due to a shoulder injury. He was selected to play in the Arizona Fall League for the Surprise Saguaros after the season. He opened the 2022 season with the Northwest Arkansas Naturals of the Double-A Texas League.

References

External links

Texas A&M Aggies bio

1999 births
Living people
Baseball pitchers
Baseball players from Texas
People from Bryan, Texas
Texas A&M Aggies baseball players
United States national baseball team players
Mat-Su Miners players
Northwest Arkansas Naturals players
Quad Cities River Bandits players
Surprise Saguaros players